Michael Doherty White (September 8, 1827 – February 6, 1917) was an American lawyer and politician who served one term as a U.S. Representative from Indiana from 1877 to 1879.

Biography 
Born in Clark County, Ohio, White moved with his parents to Tippecanoe County, Indiana, in 1829, and pursued classical studies. He moved to Crawfordsville, Indiana, in 1848.
He attended the county seminary and Wabash College, Crawfordsville, clerked in a store for one year, and studied law to gain admission to the bar in 1854. He commenced the practice of his profession in Crawfordsville, and was a law partner of Gen. Lew Wallace. White served as prosecuting attorney of Montgomery and Boone Counties from 1854 to 1856, and served as member of the Indiana State Senate from 1860 to 1864.

Congress 
White was elected as a Republican to the Forty-fifth Congress (March 4, 1877 – March 3, 1879). He was not a candidate for renomination in 1878.

Later career and death 
He continued the practice of law in Crawfordsville, Indiana, until 1911, and died there on February 6, 1917. He was interred in the Masonic Cemetery.

References 

1827 births
1917 deaths
Republican Party Indiana state senators
Indiana lawyers
American prosecutors
People from Clark County, Ohio
Wabash College alumni
19th-century American politicians
People from Tippecanoe County, Indiana
People from Crawfordsville, Indiana
19th-century American lawyers
Republican Party members of the United States House of Representatives from Indiana